The World Professional Association for Transgender Health (WPATH), formerly the Harry Benjamin International Gender Dysphoria Association (HBIGDA), is a professional organization devoted to the understanding and treatment of gender identity and gender dysphoria, and creating standardized treatment for transgender and gender variant people. WPATH was founded in September 1979 by endocrinologist and sexologist Harry Benjamin, with the goal of creating an international community of professionals specializing in treating gender variance.

Organization

Membership 
Professionals include anyone working in disciplines such as medicine, psychology, law, social work, counseling, psychotherapy, family studies, sociology, anthropology, speech and voice therapy and sexology. Non-professionals may also join, paying the same membership fee, but without voting privileges. The organization is funded by its membership and by donations and grants from non-commercial sources.

Regional organizations 
WPATH is affiliated with several regional organizations, including the European Professional Association for Transgender Health, the United States Professional Association for Transgender Health and ASIAPATH.

Standards of Care 

WPATH publishes the Standards of Care for the Health of Transgender and Gender Diverse People, educates professionals and consumers, sponsors scientific conferences, and provides ethical guidelines for professionals. The first version of the Standards of Care were published in 1979. Version 7 was published in 2011. WPATH released Version 8 in 2022.

History 

The organization was originally named after Harry Benjamin, one of the earliest physicians to work with transgender people.

Presidents 
Paul A. Walker, Ph.D., 1979–1981
Donald R. Laub, M.D., 1981–1983
  Milton T. Edgerton, M.D., 1983–1985
Ira B. Pauly, M.D., 1985–1987
  Aaron T. Bilowitz, M.D., 1987–1989
  Jan Walinder, M.D., 1989–1991
  Leah Schaefer, Ed.D., 1991–1995
  Friedmann Pfaefflin, M.D. 1995–1997
Richard Green, J.D., 1997–1999
Alice Webb, DHS, 1999
Eli Coleman, Ph.D., 1999–2003
  Walter Meyer III, M.D., 2003–2005
  Stan Monstrey, M.D., 2005–2007
Stephen Whittle, OBE, 2007–2009
  Walter O.Bockting, Ph.D., L.P., 2009–2011
  Lin Fraser, Ed.D., 2011–2013
Jamison Green, Ph.D., 2013–2015
  Gail Knudson, M.D., FRCPC, 2016–2018
  Vin Tangpricha, M.D., Ph.D., 2018–2020
Walter Pierre Bouman, M.D., Ph.D., 2020–2022
 Marci Bowers, M.D., 2022–2024

References

Transgender and medicine
International LGBT organizations
LGBT professional associations
Transgender organizations in the United States
International medical and health organizations
Non-profit organizations based in Illinois
Organizations established in 1979
Transgender studies